Leo Ernest Britt (27 March 1908 – 1979) was a British-American actor. He made about 40 film and television appearances between 1933 and 1975, both in England and the United States. He is perhaps best-remembered as the storyteller at a party in Alfred Hitchcock's Dial M for Murder (1955). One of his last film roles was General James Scarlett in the historical drama The Charge of the Light Brigade (1968).

He became a U.S. citizen in 1955, but returned to England, where he died aged 71.

Filmography
 The Monkey's Paw (1933) - Lance Corporal (uncredited)
 The Roof (1933) - Tony Freyne
 They Came by Night (1940) - George
 Take My Life (1947) - John Newcombe
 The Magnetic Monster (1953) - Dr. Benton
 No Escape (1953) - Minor Role (uncredited)
 Elephant Walk (1954) - Planter Chisholm
 Dial M for Murder (1954) - The Storyteller
 The Black Shield of Falworth (1954) - Sir Robert
 Moonfleet (1955) -  Ephraim (uncredited)
 The Court Jester (1955) - Sir Bertram (uncredited)
 The Dirty Dozen (1967) - German General in Staff Car (uncredited)
 The Charge of the Light Brigade (1968) - Gen. Scarlett
 Moon Zero Two (1969) - Senior Customs Officer
 Goodbye, Mr. Chips (1969) - Elder Master (uncredited)

References

External links

1908 births
1979 deaths
British male film actors
Place of death missing
British emigrants to the United States